Copperfield College is a public school, located in the Western Suburbs of Melbourne, Victoria, Australia. It is a college comprising two junior campuses at year 7 to 10 and one senior campus at year 11 and 12. The junior campuses are located in Kings Park and Sydenham and the senior campus is located at Delahey. The Sydenham campus is the newest of the three campuses, having been established in 2001. Copperfield College has 4 periods a day with each period lasting for 73 minutes.  

Out of all year 12 students in Copperfield College, two percent of students achieved a VCE score of at least 40 with the median score being 29.

References

External links
Official Copperfield College Website

Public high schools in Melbourne
Public primary schools in Melbourne
Buildings and structures in the City of Brimbank